Francis Evans may refer to:

 Francis Evans (diplomat) (1897–1983), British ambassador to Israel and to Argentina
 Sir Francis Evans, 1st Baronet (1840–1907), British MP for Southampton 1888–1895, 1896–1900 and Maidstone 1901–1906
 Francis Evans Cornish (1831–1878), Canadian politician
 Francis Thomas Evans Sr. (1886–1974), pioneer aviator
 Francis C. Evans (1914–2002), American ecologist and professor of zoology
 Francis Evans (footballer) (born 2001), Australian rules footballer for Port Adelaide

See also 
Frank Evans (disambiguation)